The Last Wolf is a children's book written by Michael Morpurgo and illustrated by Michael Foreman, published in 2002. It won the Nestlé Smarties Book Prize Bronze Award.

Plot
Miya helps her grandfather, Michael McLeod, become interested in computers. Michael comes up with the idea to trace their ancestors back to the 18th century; while working to do that, they discover a story written by their great-great-great-great-great grandfather.

In the story, their great-great-great-great-great grandfather, Robbie McLeod, talks about his childhood. After being orphaned, his cruel uncle had looked after him; to escape the abuse, Robbie ran away into the woods. He found a male wolf pup who, similarly, had also been orphaned, and looked after him, naming it Charlie. A few days later, Robbie and Charlie made their way to America in hopes of a better life, but they were disillusioned; in America, there had been a war between the redcoats and the rebels. They encountered life-threatening situations.

As the years passed, Charlie's temperament naturally became wilder and more animalistic. Robbie noticed the change in Charlie and, reluctantly, let him go. He built a farm next to a lake where he occasionally saw Charlie. A couple years later, Robbie got married and had a son named Alan. The last time Robbie saw Charlie, Charlie had also started a family of his own.

After reading the story, Miya and her grandfather decide to travel to America to see where Robbie and Charlie lived.

References

2002 British novels
British children's novels
Children's historical novels
Novels about wolves
Novels set in Scotland
Novels set in the United States
Novels by Michael Morpurgo
Doubleday (publisher) books